This is a list of sieges, land and naval battles of the War of the Fourth Coalition (9 October 1806 – 9 July 1807). It can be divided into several campaigns:
 the Jena campaign in modern-day Thuringia (9–14 October 1806);
 the post-Jena or Prenzlau-Lübeck campaign in Brandenburg and Pomerania (October–November 1806); various sieges resulting from this offensive continued until August 1807;
 the Eylau campaign in the eastern provinces of Prussia (23 December 1806 – 8 February 1807);
 the Friedland campaign in the eastern provinces of Prussia (16 February 1807 – 14 June 1807).
Some battles overlapped with the Franco-Swedish War. Excluded is the Gunboat War.

See also 
 List of battles of the War of the First Coalition
 List of battles of the War of the Second Coalition
 List of battles of the War of the Third Coalition
 List of battles of the War of the Fifth Coalition
 List of battles of the War of the Sixth Coalition
 List of battles of the Hundred Days (War of the Seventh Coalition)

References 

Fourth Coalition